This list displays a chronology of the annual top ten leaders in career base hits in  Major League Baseball (MLB) from 1876 through 2022.

The table assists in identifying the most significant players in each era, and helps to understand the importance of many past stars. Before Pete Rose broke Ty Cobb's record for career hits, for example, Tris Speaker, Stan Musial, and Hank Aaron had each reached the number two spot in succession. 

It is also quite valuable to identify the leaders during the 19th century, when seasons were shorter (usually from 60 to 130 games); while nearly 250 players have now reached the 2,000-hit plateau, barely a dozen had done so by the end of the 19th century. 

In the era before 1893, when the distance between the pitcher and home plate was extended from 45 feet to 60 feet, long-neglected stars Deacon White and Paul Hines were mainstays among the top five, along with Cap Anson and Jim O'Rourke.

This chart uses the hit totals that Major League Baseball officially recognizes, as maintained and provided by the Elias Sports Bureau; they are derived from the annual official league statistics, even when those totals have been proven by later research to be in error. Particularly with regard to players from before 1920, these totals often differ from those used by ESPN, CNN/Sports Illustrated, The Sporting News, the Baseball-Reference website, or by MLB's two longtime official encyclopedias, The Baseball Encyclopedia and Total Baseball. They are also not the same as the historical totals displayed on MLB's official website. 

While the specific totals may vary between sources, and slight variations in the order may result, the leaders would overwhelmingly be the same regardless of which set of numbers is used; except for 1904, in no year does more than one player drop out of the top 10 when a different version of the statistics is employed. Furthermore, this table accurately represents what observers of each era believed to be true.

1876–1900

1901–1960

1961–2020

2021–

Active players are marked in bold italics.

Stats as of the end of the 2021 Major League Baseball season.

See also

List of Major League Baseball hit records

External links
Baseball-Reference.com - Top 1000 major leaguers in career hits

Major League Baseball records
Major League Baseball lists
Baseball record progressions